In mathematics, Tonelli's theorem in functional analysis is a fundamental result on the weak lower semicontinuity of nonlinear functionals on Lp spaces. As such, it has major implications for functional analysis and the calculus of variations. Roughly, it shows that weak lower semicontinuity for integral functionals is equivalent to convexity of the integral kernel. The result is attributed to the Italian mathematician Leonida Tonelli.

Statement of the theorem

Let  be a bounded domain in -dimensional Euclidean space  and let  be a continuous extended real-valued function. Define a nonlinear functional  on functions by

is convex.

See also

References

  (Theorem 10.16)

Calculus of variations
Convex analysis
Function spaces
Measure theory
Theorems in functional analysis
Variational analysis